The 2009 Malaysia FA Cup, also known as the 2009 TM Piala FA due to the competition's sponsorship by TM, was the 20th season of the Malaysia FA Cup.

Selangor has won the title for the fifth time, defeating Kelantan in the final.

Format
The Piala FA competition has reverted to the old format of play with no more open draws. It will comprise 29 teams — 15 Super League and 14 Premier League sides — with defending champions Kedah FA, Selangor FA and Terengganu FA receiving byes in the first round.

Kedah FA, who won back-to-back trebles, will play the winner of the match between Proton FC and UPB-MyTeam FC in the second round.

First round
The match first leg match for Harimau Muda and KL PLUS FC played on 24 January 2009. The second leg played on 4 February 2009. The first legs of other match played on 31 January 2009. The second legs played on 3 February 2009.

|}

Second round
The first leg match played on 21 February 2009. The second leg will be play on 24 February 2009.

|}

Quarter-final
The quarter final matches are scheduled to be played on 3 March and the weekend of 7 March 2009.

First leg

Second leg

Kelantan advance 4-2 on aggregate

Negeri Sembilan advance 1-0 on aggregate

Perlis advance 1-0 on aggregate

Selangor advance 4-1 on aggregate

Semi-final

The first leg matches were played on Tuesday, 7 April 2009, while the second legs were played on Tuesday, 18 April 2009.

First leg

Second leg

Kelantan advance on the away goals rule

Selangor FA advance 3-2 on aggregate

Final

The final was played at National Stadium, Bukit Jalil, Kuala Lumpur, on Saturday, 25 April 2009.

Selangor FA win 4-1 on penalties

Winners

Top scorers

 Last updated 9 March 2009.

 Bold indicates players whose clubs are still active in the competition.

References

 
Piala FA
2009 domestic association football cups